is a Japanese professional footballer who plays as a midfielder for Criacao Shinjuku

Career
Sawai joined J2 League club Tokyo Verdy in 2014.

Career statistics

References

External links

 
 

1995 births
Living people
Association football midfielders
Association football people from Chiba Prefecture
Japanese footballers
J2 League players
Tokyo Verdy players
AC Ajaccio players
Renofa Yamaguchi FC players